Robert Weinhauer (born May 23, 1939) is an American former basketball coach and executive.  He served as the head basketball coach at the University of Pennsylvania from 1977 to 1982 and at Arizona State University from 1982 to 1985, compiling a career college basketball record of 143–90. Weiner led the Penn Quakers to the Final Four of the 1979 NCAA Division I basketball tournament.  Weinhauer spent one season, 1985–86, as the head coach for the Detroit Spirits of the Continental Basketball Association (CBA) before moving to the National Basketball Association, where he worked as an assistant coach, scout, and executive.  He served as the general manager for the Houston Rockets from 1994 to 1996 and the Milwaukee Bucks from 1997 to 1999.

Before coming to Penn as an assistant in 1973, Weinhauer coached football, basketball, and baseball at Massapequa High School in Massapequa, New York.

Head coaching record

College

See also
 List of NCAA Division I Men's Final Four appearances by coach

References

1939 births
Living people
American basketball scouts
American men's basketball coaches
Arizona State Sun Devils men's basketball coaches
Atlanta Hawks assistant coaches
Baseball catchers
Baseball players from New York (state)
Basketball coaches from New York (state)
College men's basketball head coaches in the United States
Continental Basketball Association coaches
Cortland Red Dragons baseball players
High school baseball coaches in the United States
High school basketball coaches in New York (state)
High school football coaches in New York (state)
Houston Rockets general managers
Milwaukee Bucks assistant coaches
Milwaukee Bucks executives
Minnesota Timberwolves assistant coaches
Penn Quakers men's basketball coaches
People from Oyster Bay (town), New York
Philadelphia 76ers assistant coaches
Philadelphia 76ers executives
Philadelphia 76ers scouts
Sportspeople from Nassau County, New York
Sportspeople from New York City
Massapequa High School alumni